The 2009 Seguros Bolívar Open Medellín was a professional tennis tournament played on outdoor red clay courts. It was the sixth edition of the tournament which was part of the 2009 ATP Challenger Tour. It took place in Medellín, Colombia between 2 and 8 November 2009.

ATP entrants

Seeds

 Rankings are as of October 26, 2009.

Other entrants
The following players received wildcards into the singles main draw:
  Ricardo Corrente
  Alejandro González
  Filip Krajinović
  Eduardo Struvay

The following players received entry from the qualifying draw:
  Andre Begemann
  Marius Copil
  Guillermo Hormazábal
  Lars Pörschke

Champions

Singles

 Juan Ignacio Chela def.  João Souza, 6–4, 4–6, 6–4

Doubles

 Sebastián Decoud /  Eduardo Schwank def.  Diego Junqueira /  David Marrero, 6–0, 6–2

External links
Official website of Seguros Bolívar Tennis
ITF Search 
2009 Draws

Seguros Bolivar Open Medellin
2009 in Colombian tennis
Tennis tournaments in Colombia
Seguros Bolívar Open Medellín